Trzęsów may refer to the following places in Poland:
Trzęsów, Lower Silesian Voivodeship (south-west Poland)
Trzęsów, Greater Poland Voivodeship (west-central Poland)